Sibree is a surname. Notable people with the surname include:
 James Sibree (1836–1929), English missionary in Madagascar
 Prue Sibree (born 1946), Australian politician